Hellula caecigena is a moth in the family Crambidae. It was described by Edward Meyrick in 1933. It is found in the Democratic Republic of the Congo, where it has been recorded from Katanga, Kongo Central and Kasai-Occidental.

References

Moths described in 1933
Glaphyriini
Moths of Africa